Morgan Creek may refer to:

Streams
Morgan Creek (California), a tributary of Pine Creek in Mono and Inyo counties
Morgan Creek (Minnesota), a tributary of the Minnesota River in Blue Earth and Brown counties
Morgan Creek (Tohickon Creek), a tributary of the Tohickon Creek in Bucks County, Pennsylvania
Morgan Creek (Tennessee), a tributary of the Duck River in Hickman County

Other uses
Morgan Creek Entertainment, an American movie studio